Batman: Assault on Arkham is a 2014 direct-to-video animated superhero film that is the 20th film of the DC Universe Animated Original Movies. The film was directed by Jay Oliva and Ethan Spaulding, produced by James Tucker, and the script was written by Heath Corson. The film was screened at the 2014 San Diego Comic-Con on July 25, 2014, and it was released digitally on July 29 and on physical media on August 12.

The film is set in the universe of the Batman: Arkham video game franchise, occurring after Arkham Origins; Jay Oliva states it takes place about two years before Arkham Asylum. James Tucker states that the movie was intended to bridge the gap between Arkham Origins and Arkham Asylum. The story focuses primarily on the Suicide Squad, particularly Batman villains Deadshot and Harley Quinn with Batman in a supporting role. In the film, the Suicide Squad, consisting of six criminals, are dispatched by Amanda Waller to break into Arkham Asylum, where they must contend with the asylum's inmates and Batman as they attempt to complete their mission to reclaim information stolen by the Riddler.

The film stars Kevin Conroy as Bruce Wayne/Batman (reprising his role as Batman from the DC Animated Universe, among other numerous DC properties, including the Arkham series), Neal McDonough as Floyd Lawton/Deadshot, Hynden Walch as Dr. Harleen Quinzel/Harley Quinn (who reprises her role from The Batman) and Matthew Gray Gubler as Edward Nygma/Riddler. In addition, Troy Baker, CCH Pounder, Nolan North, and Martin Jarvis reprise their roles of Joker, Amanda Waller, Oswald Cobblepot/Penguin and Alfred Pennyworth from Arkham Origins (with Pounder previously appearing in the DCAU and Superman/Batman: Public Enemies and North and Jarvis appearing in Arkham City as well) while Jennifer Hale reprises her role of Louise Lincoln/Killer Frost from the DCAU and other properties.

Plot
Batman rescues the Riddler from a black ops assassination ordered by A.R.G.U.S.' director Amanda Waller, returning him to Arkham Asylum. Invoking Priority Ultraviolet, Waller captures wanted supercriminals Black Spider, Captain Boomerang, Deadshot, Harley Quinn, KGBeast, Killer Frost, and King Shark for the Suicide Squad. Their mission is to break into Arkham and recover a thumbdrive in Riddler's cane containing sensitive knowledge about the squad. She forces compliance by threatening to detonate nano-bombs implanted in their necks, and KGBeast is killed when he attempts to walk out on Waller. The remaining six are sent to Gotham City to get equipment from the Penguin, and while staying the night at the Iceberg Lounge Harley and Deadshot sleep together. The next day Harley commits a crime to lure Batman out, who is looking for a dirty bomb the Joker had hidden in the city. Harley is taken back to Arkham.

At Arkham, the incarcerated Joker taunts Harley, which causes her to fire a gun at him in a rage. While this is happening, the other members of the squad infiltrate the Asylum and loop the previous day's security camera footage to keep both Batman and Waller from noticing them. The team finds Riddler's cane and Harley's mallet, but the cane contains nothing. Batman arrives after having noticed the security camera ruse and fights the squad. He defeats them one by one before being seemingly beaten by Black Spider. Killer Frost splits from the group and goes to Riddler's cell; Waller secretly ordered her to carry out the real mission of the squad, to kill Riddler. Riddler reveals that Waller can't detonate his neck explosive because he knows how to disarm them, and the squad agrees to help him escape if he can disarm theirs. Meanwhile, Joker notices a weakness in his cell walls from Harley's attempt to shoot him and short-circuits the door to escape.

Riddler hooks the squad up – minus Black Spider – to an electro shock machine to fry the explosives. Riddler turns on the machine as Waller calls for an update; seeing the bombs' signals fading and learning of the squad's betrayal, she activates them. Harley, Deadshot, Boomerang, and Frost survive, but King Shark's head explodes due to his thick skin blocking the electricity. The group questions how Black Spider's bomb didn't detonate, and Riddler realizes that "Black Spider" is Batman in disguise; Black Spider had just been killed by the bomb detonation on his neck by Waller moments ago. After revealing himself, Batman demands the squad explain why they're in Arkham. Joker arrives and attacks Batman, providing a distraction for the squad to escape. Joker, enraged at Deadshot for "touching his stuff" by sleeping with Harley, intercepts them, but Harley sweet-talks him into forgiving her. As the remaining squad members flee, Batman encounters them and deduces from Deadshot that Joker has hidden the dirty bomb in Harley's mallet, which he then activates. Joker releases Arkham's inmates (including Two-Face, Bane, Scarecrow, and Poison Ivy) as a distraction to allow him to escape.

Frost is killed in the chaos by Bane, and Deadshot subdues Captain Boomerang to board a helicopter and escape. Batman notices three heartbeats coming from the helicopter and realizes Joker and Harley have stowed away in it. He follows them in the Batwing while Deadshot and Joker fight. The helicopter collides into a building; Batman knocks out Harley and disarms the bomb. At the same time, Deadshot pins Joker inside the helicopter, which then falls to the ground and explodes.

In the aftermath, Batman confronts Waller over the incident. He clarifies that her actions allowed Riddler to escape from Arkham, and warns her to discontinue the Task Force X program. Waller dismisses his warning and taunts that Joker's body was not found in the helicopter crash. Once Batman leaves, Waller notices a laser trained on her. Deadshot is shown to be the source, reunited with his daughter, and the movie ends before he pulls the trigger, leaving Waller's fate uncertain.

Voice cast

Kevin Conroy – Bruce Wayne / Batman
Neal McDonough – Floyd Lawton / Deadshot
Hynden Walch – Harleen Quinzel / Harley Quinn
Matthew Gray Gubler – Edward Nygma / Riddler
Troy Baker – Joker
CCH Pounder – Amanda Waller
Greg Ellis – George Harkness / Captain Boomerang
Giancarlo Esposito – Eric Needham / Black Spider
John DiMaggio – Nanaue / King Shark
Jennifer Hale – Louise Lincoln / Killer Frost
Nolan North – Anatoli Knyazev / KGBeast, Oswald Cobblepot / Penguin
Eric Bauza – Security Guy
Chris Cox – Commissioner James Gordon
Martin Jarvis – Alfred Pennyworth
Peter Jessop – Watch Commander
Christian Lanz – Jonathan Crane / Scarecrow, Victor Zsasz
Andrea Romano – Woman
Travis Willingham – Morgue Guy
Mick Wingert – Joker Security Guy

Some characters from the Arkham games appear in non-speaking cameos including Bane, Two-Face, and Poison Ivy.

Production

Development
In 2009, video game developer Rocksteady Studios launched the beginning of their Batman: Arkham series with Batman: Arkham Asylum. With a total of four main entries, the series reached critical acclaim and success. Near the end of development of Batman: Arkham Origins, Warner Bros. Animation approached Heath Corson to write a story focusing on the Suicide Squad set within the Batman Arkhamverse. Jay Oliva and Ethan Spaulding were brought in to director and James Tucker to produce Upon reading the script, Oliva stated that "...it was very different than what I was used to, because I started prepping for this film, I thought to myself 'Well you know what, if I directed this a little differently [sic] like what if I directed this like a Guy Ritchie film.'" The film would be directed with a similar style to a Poliziotteschi Italian mob film. For the team, Corson knew that he wanted Deadshot, Captain Boomerang, and Harley Quinn, because she knew the in-and-outs of Arkham. He described the relationship between Deadshot and Boomerang as "...Ocean's Eleven, but at every turn Brad Pitt tried to kill George Clooney."

Pre-production
In the casting process, some actors were taken from their Batman: Arkham roles while others weren't. Kevin Conroy, the voice actor of Batman in Batman: The Animated Series, most of the Batman: Arkham games, and many other DC properties who is considered the definitive Batman voice actor was brought on to voice the character. Neal McDonough was brought on the play Deadshot instead of Chris Cox who voices Deadshot in the Arkham games, who instead voices Commissioner Jim Gordon. Hynden Walch reprises her role as Harley Quinn from The Batman. Arleen Sorkin, who played Harley Quinn in Batman: Arkham Asylum, nor Tara Strong who voiced the character in Batman: Arkham City, were brought in for the film. Matthew Gray Gubler voices the Riddler instead of Wally Wingert from the series and Troy Baker voices the Joker instead of Mark Hamill. CCH Pounder reprises her role as Amanda Waller from Batman: Arkham Origins and Martin Jarvis reprised his role as Alfred Pennyworth from the Arkhamverse. Greg Ellis was brought in to voice Captain Boomerang, Giancarlo Esposito to voice Black Spider, John DiMaggio as King SHark, and Jennifer Hale as Killer Frost. Nolan North reprises his role as the Penguin from the Arkham games, and additionally voices KGBeast. Christian Lanz voices Scarecrow, replacing Dino Andrade from Arkham Asylum, as well as Victor Zsasz, replacing Danny Jacobs from Arkham Asylum and City.

For the soundtrack, Robert J. Kral was brought in to compose. In a press release, Oliva said "We usually do the operatic epic music that we’ve all become accustomed to in the live action and animated comic book films for the last twenty five years…. James Tucker, my producer, was very supportive of the idea of doing a more contemporary take on the superhero music and when Rob sent us his first pass of the score, we were tremendously pleased."

Production
When handling the look of Arkham Asylum, the artists mainly took inspiration from the way it was depicted inBatman: Arkham Asylum, while also aiming to increase the scary factor the game held. The team also aimed to add a foreboding and haunting nature to the depiction and sounds. The voice actors were recorded at Salami Studios in North Hollywood, California.

Soundtrack

The soundtrack to Batman: Assault on Arkham was released on July 30, 2014, with music composed by Robert J. Kral.

Track list

Reception

Critical reception

Scott Mendelson of Forbes roundly praised Assault on Arkham for its action, art style, humor, voices, and characters, calling it one of the best films of DC's direct-to-video lineup. He described it as a "gleefully immoral" heist film which, having "no real [plot] arc to speak of", relies on its violent action and clever character dynamics within the Suicide Squad to carry it. Due to its villainous protagonists, dark comedy, and sexual content, Mendelson considers the production of Assault on Arkham an experimental decision by DC, and a successful experiment as it tells a style of comic book story that would never get approval as a live-action project.

Seth Robison of Newsarama was far more critical, considering the animation, characterization, and storytelling in the film poor. He had particular dislike for the voice acting, which he believed squandered a talented cast by delivering a "disjointed" performance, and for Assault on Arkhams interpretation of Amanda Waller, which he believed simplified her into merely another villain. He further found Deadshot's sympathetic characterization opaque to non-comic readers and Harley Quinn's crazy act obnoxious. Overall, Robison deemed the experience of the film "superficial" and thought it compared unfavorably to those offered by the Arkham video games and the Justice League Unlimited episode "Task Force X".

Sales

The film earned $5,820,248 in domestic home video sales.

Suicide Squad: Kill the Justice League (2023) 

A Suicide Squad game was first considered a possibility following the endings of Batman: Arkham Origins and Batman: Arkham Origins: Blackgate, featuring post-credits scenes with Amanda Waller (voiced by Pounder) recruiting various supervillains. In the years since Batman: Arkham Knight released, there had been rumors suggesting the studio has been working on a Suicide Squad game, but no official announcement was made from the development team or publisher. In December 2016, Jason Schreier from Kotaku revealed that the title had been cancelled, and WB Games Montreal had shifted their focus to the next Batman game (later revealed to be Gotham Knights.) As a result, Rocksteady Studios took over as the main developer of the game. While concept art from cancelled versions of the game surfaced, the finished game's official artwork was revealed by Rocksteady on August 7, 2020. The first trailer for the game premiered at DC FanDome. As the game is set in the "Arkhamverse", plot threads established in the Batman: Arkham series would continue in Suicide Squad: Kill the Justice League. The game will feature four playable characters: Harley Quinn, Deadshot, Captain Boomerang, and King Shark, who are tasked with defeating Brainiac when he attacks Metropolis and enslaves the Justice League with his mind-controlling technology.

With the inclusion of King Shark, the game retcons Assault on Arkham as well as several subsequent comics. Amanda Waller is portrayed by Debra Wilson, replacing Pounder.

Notes

References

External links

2014 action films
2010s American animated films
2010s direct-to-video animated superhero films
2010s animated superhero films
2014 animated films
2014 direct-to-video films
2014 films
Animated action films
Animated Batman films
Animated films based on video games
Batman: Arkham
DC Universe Animated Original Movies
Direct-to-video interquel films
2010s English-language films
Films directed by Ethan Spaulding
Films directed by Jay Oliva
Films set in psychiatric hospitals
Suicide Squad films
Works based on Warner Bros. video games